Shattered Suns is a Real-time strategy game set in space.  It focuses on unique 3D combat with sophisticated gameplay mechanics. The game was released on August 19, 2008.

Reception

The game received "generally unfavorable reviews" according to the review aggregation website Metacritic.

References

External links
 Game Page
 

2008 video games
Real-time strategy video games
Video games developed in the United States
Windows games
Windows-only games